Corymica is a genus of moths in the family Geometridae described by Francis Walker in 1860.

Description
Palpi reaching well beyond the frons and fringed with hair. Antennae of male ciliated. Hind tibia not dilated. Forewings of male with a very large fovea of hyaline membrane. The apex acute and somewhat rounded. The outer margin crenulate (scolloped) near the apex. Inner margin highly excised from middle to outer angle. Vein 3 from before angle of cell. Veins 7, 8 and 9 stalked and vein 10 absent. Vein 11 anastomosing (fusing) with vein 12 and connected with vein 8 and 9. Hindwings with costa excised beyond middle. Vein 3 from before angle of cell.

Species
 Corymica arnearia Walker, 1860
 Corymica deducta (Walker, 1866)
 Corymica latimarginata Swinhoe, 1902
 Corymica pardalota Prout, 1931
 Corymica pryeri (Butler, 1878)
 Corymica specularia (Moore, [1868])
 Corymica vesicularia (Walker, 1866)

References

 
 

Hypochrosini